KYAP (96.9 FM) is a radio station licensed to Nunn, Colorado, and is owned by Appaloosa Broadcasting Company, Inc.  It airs a Classic Country radio format.

History
The station went on the air as KBPV on October 18, 1999. On November 1, 1999, the station changed its call sign to KKRR. On November 7, 2001, the callsign changed again, this time to KHAT. On November 18, 2003, the callsign changed once more, to KIMX.

On November 21, 2016, the 96.9 frequency began testing with a simulcast of oldies-formatted KJMP 870 AM, in Pierce, Colorado.  The previous contemporary hit radio (CHR) format moved to KIMX 104.5 FM Centennial, Wyoming. On November 23, 2016, KIMX changed its call sign to KYAP.

On November 8, 2019, KYAP became "K96.9" playing Classic Country. The radio station is currently operated under LMA by Loud Media.

References

External links

YAP
Radio stations established in 2002
2002 establishments in Colorado
Classic country radio stations in the United States